Matvey Pavlovich Eliseev (born 31 March 1993) is a Russian biathlete. He competed in the 2018 Winter Olympics.

Biathlon results
All results are sourced from the International Biathlon Union.

Olympic Games
0 medals

World Championships
2 medals (2 bronze)

References

External links

1993 births
Living people
Biathletes at the 2018 Winter Olympics
Russian male biathletes
Olympic biathletes of Russia
Biathlon World Championships medalists
People from Zelenograd
20th-century Russian people
21st-century Russian people